Spilomyia digitata is a species of Hoverfly in the family Syrphidae.

The species is distributed across Italy. The species is also diurnal.

References

Eristalinae
Insects described in 1865
Taxa named by Camillo Rondani
Diptera of Europe